The National Cat Groomers Institute of America (NCGIA) is an American organization devoted to training and certifying people in the grooming of cats. Headquartered in Greer, South Carolina, it was founded in 2007 by Danelle German, the organization's current president.

Purpose
Dog grooming courses have been offered at every school of that type. Most cats, though require additional grooming as a matter of cat health. This is especially important with domestic long-haired cats such as Maine Coons, Norwegian Forest Cats, Persians, and Siberians in terms of hairballs that these breeds may ingest and matting issues. In an effort to close this gap, the NCGIA was created in 2007 by German, a Persian cat breeder who owned a cat grooming business in Simpsonville, South Carolina (southeast of Greenville) until late 2009.

Certifications
NCGIA offers two certifications for cat groomers: Certified Feline Master Groomer (CFMG) and Certified Feline Creative Groomer (CFCG). As of 2010, there are three certified instructors. The courses are two weeks in length, and involve practical and written exams on grooming cats.

Promotion
The NCGIA offers exhibits of their services at grooming trade shows both in the United States and worldwide.

See also

Cats in the United States

References

External links
National Cat Groomers Institute of America

Cats in the United States
Organizations based in South Carolina
Organizations established in 2007